Neil Francis Jeremy Mendoza, Baron Mendoza,  (born 2 November 1959) is a British businessman, academic administrator, and member of the House of Lords.  

Provost of Oriel College Oxford since September 2018, Lord Mendoza also serves as HM Government Commissioner for Cultural Recovery and Renewal since May 2020.

Early life and education
Neil Francis Jeremy Mendoza was born on 2 November 1959 in London. Mendoza was educated at Haberdashers' Aske's Boys' School, Elstree, before going up to read geography at Oriel College, Oxford, matriculating in 1978. He was a founding member of the Piers Gaveston Society.

Career
After periods in banking and film finance Mendoza co-founded Forward Publishing with William Sieghart in 1986. Forward pioneered the custom media business in the UK and became one of the leading independent contract publishers. The company specialised in international and multilingual projects with corporate partners including IBM, Tesco and Patek Philippe & Co. In 2001, Forward was sold to WPP plc.

Mendoza was appointed the UK Government's Commissioner for Cultural Recovery and Renewal in May 2020, and, on 31 July 2020, he was elevated to the peerage, taking his seat on the Conservative benches in the House of Lords.

During 2020 he played a leading role in the creation of the Department for Digital, Culture, Media and Sport £2-billion Culture Recovery Fund and is a member of its Board. 

He chairs the Culture and Heritage Capital Board. He co-chaired a report, Boundless Creativity, for the Department for Digital, Culture, Media and Sport and the Arts and Humanities Research Council.

In 2016 Mendoza was appointed as Commissioner of Historic England by the Department for Digital, Culture, Media and Sport, before being appointed as a DCMS non-executive board member.

In 2017 he published the Mendoza Review of Museums in England for the UK Government. In the same year Mendoza was also the lead reviewer on the Strategic Review of DCMS-sponsored museums conducted under Cabinet Office guidelines.

Lord Mendoza is currently Chairman of The Illuminated River Foundation. He is a non-executive director of Meira GTx, a gene therapy company with research facilities in New York and London. He sits on the Board of Visitors for the Ashmolean Museum. 

In 2020, he was elected an Honorary Fellow of Trinity College Dublin.

Previously, Chairman of The Prince's Foundation for Children and The Arts, Vice-Chair of Soho Theatre, on the board of the Almeida Theatre and the Shakespeare Schools Foundation, he also  was an independent trustee of The Daily Mail charity, Mail Force.
Appointed to the panel of The Taylor Review: Sustainability of English Churches and Cathedrals, he was a judge of the Laurence Olivier Awards for theatre for 2010 and 2011.

Mendoza then served as Chairman of the Landmark Trust, a UK historic building preservation charity, from 2011 to 2021. 

Mendoza was appointed Commander of the Order of the British Empire (CBE) in the 2023 New Year Honours for services to arts and culture.

House of Lords
In July 2020, it was announced that Mendoza had been nominated for a life peerage by Prime Minister Boris Johnson. On 16 September 2020, he was created a life peer with the title Baron Mendoza, of King's Reach in the City of London. He sits in the House of Lords as a Conservative Party peer, and made his maiden speech on 10 November 2020.

Personal life
Mendoza married Amelia Wallace in 1993. They have a son and a daughter.

References

1959 births
Living people
English people of Portuguese-Jewish descent
People educated at Haberdashers' Boys' School
Alumni of Oriel College, Oxford
English philanthropists
English businesspeople
Conservative Party (UK) life peers
Honorary Fellows of Trinity College Dublin
Provosts of Oriel College, Oxford
Life peers created by Elizabeth II
Commanders of the Order of the British Empire